Igor Nikolayevich Rudensky (born September 11, 1962 in Iksha, Dmitrovsky District, Moscow Oblast) is a Russian political figure and a deputy of the 3rd, 4th, 5th, 6th, and 8th State Dumas. In 2003, he was granted a Candidate of Sciences in Economics degree. 

After graduating from the Riga Flight Technical School of Civil Aviation, Rudensky held various positions in the production sphere. From 1999 to 2016, he was a deputy of the 3rd, 4th, 5th, and 6th State Dumas. Since September 2021, he has served as deputy of the 8th State Duma from the Penza constituency.

In 2014, Rudensky filed a lawsuit against oppositioner Alexei Navalny. The reason for the lawsuit was the information disseminated by Navalny that Rudensky did not mention the land plot that he owned in the tax declaration for 2012. The Lyublino District Court of Moscow satisfied the claim.

Awards  
 Order of Honour (Russia)
 Medal of the Order "For Merit to the Fatherland"

References

1962 births
Living people
United Russia politicians
21st-century Russian politicians
Eighth convocation members of the State Duma (Russian Federation)
Sixth convocation members of the State Duma (Russian Federation)
Fifth convocation members of the State Duma (Russian Federation)
Fourth convocation members of the State Duma (Russian Federation)
Third convocation members of the State Duma (Russian Federation)